Sialum Rural LLG is a local-level government (LLG) of Morobe Province, Papua New Guinea.

Wards
01. Gitua
02. Kumukio
03. Sialum (Sialum language speakers)
04. Gitukia
05. Kukuya
06. Kangkeu
07. Rua
08. Nungen (including the village of Nunzen)
09. Kanome
10. Ririwo
11. Karako
12. Zankoa
13. Wandokai
14. Walingai
15. Rebafu
16. Zange Fifi
17. Zuzumau
18. Masa
19. Kingarenau
20. Siwea

References

Local-level governments of Morobe Province